Franklin Clark Miller (August 11, 1938 – November 5, 2008) was a professional American football player in the National Football League (NFL) who played defensive end for nine seasons for the San Francisco 49ers, the Washington Redskins, and the Los Angeles Rams.  He played college football at Utah State University and was drafted in the fifth round of the 1961 NFL Draft.  Miller was also selected in the fourteenth round of the 1961 AFL Draft by the Oakland Raiders.

Clark Miller died of a heart attack on November 5, 2008, at a hospital in Paso Robles, California a week after he was injured and hospitalized following a horse riding accident.

References

1938 births
2008 deaths
Players of American football from Oakland, California
American football defensive linemen
Utah State Aggies football players
San Francisco 49ers players
Washington Redskins players
Los Angeles Rams players